Artyom Filippovich Dudolev (born 30 September 1991) is a Russian former football player.

Club career
He made his debut in the Russian Second Division for FC Sibir-2 Novosibirsk on 23 April 2011 in a game against FC KUZBASS Kemerovo.

He made his Russian Football National League debut for FC Sibir Novosibirsk on 1 April 2013 in a game against FC Shinnik Yaroslavl.

References

External links
 

1991 births
Footballers from Saint Petersburg
Living people
Russian footballers
Association football midfielders
FC Sibir Novosibirsk players
FC Arsenal Tula players
FC Sokol Saratov players